Carlos Alvarado Quesada (born 1980) is the President of Costa Rica.

Carlos Alvarado may also refer to:

Estadio Carlos Alvarado, a stadium in Costa Rica

People with the name
Carlos Alberto Alvarado (born 1945), Argentine Olympic equestrian
Carlos Alvarado Reyes (born 1954), Costa Rican cyclist
Carlos Alvarado Lang (1905–1961), Mexican printmaker
Carlos Alvarado-Larroucau (born 1964), Argentine author
Carlos Alvarado (footballer, born 1927), Costa Rican footballer
Carlos Alvarado (footballer, born 1949), Honduran footballer

See also
Giancarlo Alvarado (born 1978), Puerto Rican baseball pitcher

Alvarado, Carlos